Paustian House is a large furniture showroom located on the waterfront in Copenhagen. Completed in 1987, it is one of the most notable works in Denmark  by prize-winning architect Jørn Utzon, who also designed the Sydney Opera House. Utzon's son Kim designed two adjacent buildings which were completed in 2000.

Architecture
In 1985 Ole Paustian, the owner of a successful furniture business, invited Utzon to design a showroom building on the Copenhagen waterfront as an extension to one of his warehouses. Utzon sent design sketches to his sons Jan and Kim who produced final drawings and construction plans.

Inspiration for the design came to Utzon while he was walking through a forest of beech trees. In his own words: "Walking in a Danish beech forest is like going through a hall of pillars. This hall of pillars dissolves into branches and into a leafy crown represented by the roof." The airy, three-storey building with extensive exhibition space is indeed reminiscent of a forest. Standing on the edge of the harbour, its external pillars give it a temple-like appearance. Inside, tall white fan-topped columns stretch up to the ceiling where they are connected by geometrical archways. Utzon's son Kim, who helped with the original plans, went on to expand the complex with two new buildings housing a restaurant and a yacht club as well as extensions to the showrooms. Utzon's daughter Lin contributed to the interior decoration including the blue tiling along the wooden staircases.

The furniture and restaurant

The showrooms not only display furniture designed by Paustian A/S (founded 1937) but also exhibit imported collections from Finland and Switzerland as well as items from other top designers. The building also houses a first-class restaurant.

Gallery

References

External links
 Paustian website 

Retail companies of Denmark
Retail buildings in Copenhagen
Jørn Utzon buildings in Denmark
Jan Utzon buildings
Kim Utzon buildings
Residential buildings completed in 1988
Modernist architecture in Copenhagen